Worship is Michael W. Smith's sixteenth album. The album, Smith's first album of contemporary worship music, was recorded live and was released on Reunion Records in 2001. The album was reissued as a DualDisc in 2005.

Background 

Smith sang "Above All" at President George W. Bush's  2001 inaugural prayer service.  In 2002, he released a follow-up album Worship Again and a DVD comprising selections from both albums.

Track listing

Personnel 
 Michael W. Smith – vocals, acoustic piano, programming on "Purified"
 David Hamilton – keyboards, music director; orchestra arrangement, writer and conductor on "Purified"
 Jim Daneker – keyboards, MIDI programming, programming on "Purified"
 Kent Hooper – programming on "Above All" (studio version)
 Wes King – acoustic guitars
 Glenn Pearce – electric guitars
 Jerry McPherson – additional guitars on "Above All" (studio version)
 Brent Milligan – bass
 Raymond Boyd – drums
 Ken Lewis – additional percussion on "Purified"
 David Davidson – violin, viola
 The Nashville String Machine – orchestra on "Purified"
 Carl Gorodetzky – contractor
 Ric Dominico – music preparation
 Anna Smith – spoken word
 Emily Smith – spoken word
 Darren Whitehead – spoken word

Additional vocals on "Purified" and "Above All" (studio version)
 Leigh Cappillino
 Christine Denté
 Darwin Hobbs
 Kristie Mays
 Fiona Mellett
 Leanne Palmore
 Chance Scoggins 
 Terry White

Choir
 Chris Rice 
 Amy Grant 
 Mark Schultz 
 Geron Davis
 Greg Long
 Phillips, Craig & Dean 
 Becky Davis 
 Erin O'Donnell 
 Shaun Groves 
 Out of Eden 
 Allison Redman 
 Mike Carpino 
 Raphael Giglio 
 Ginny Owens 
 Kelly Minter 
 Cindy Morgan 
 Darwin Hobbs 
 Wes King 
 Jason Perry (of Plus One) 
 Nathan Walters (of Plus One)

Production 
 Michael W. Smith – executive producer, producer
 Tom Laune – producer, engineer, mixing at Bridgeway Studio (Nashville, Tennessee)
 Lynn Fuston – string session recording ("Purified")
 Brent King – live recording engineer
 Rob Burrell – live recording engineer, Pro Tools, editing
 Joel Singer – remote recording system at On Site Recording (Hudson, Ohio)
 Jimmy Abegg – cover illustration
 Eric Elwell – album production coordinator for MWS Productions
 Jason McArthur – label production coordinator 
 Chris Schultz – production manager
 Ben Pearson – photography
 Glen Rose – photography 
 Scott Hughes – art direction
 Stephanie McBrayer – art direction
 Ian Black – design
 Tim Parker – design
 B. Joyner – design
 Jamie Kearney – styling
 Cheryl Guillot – hair and make-up

Charts

Weekly charts

Year-end charts

Certifications

References 

2001 live albums
Reunion Records albums
Michael W. Smith live albums